American Nervoso is the first studio album by American metalcore band Botch, released in 1998 through Hydra Head Records. It was re-issued in 2007, with five bonus tracks appended to the end of the record, consisting of demos and extended versions. The re-issue includes demos, extended versions of songs and the two opening measures of "Hives", which were accidentally clipped off in the original mastering, and was remastered by Matt Bayles sometime in 2006.

Critical reception 
Writing about the album's re-issue in 2007, Adrien Begrand of PopMatters said "eight years after the fact, Botch's debut album is still as awe-inspiring as it ever was."

Track listing

Credits
Band members
Brian Cook – bass guitar, backing vocals and production
Dave Knudson – guitar, production, layout and design  
Tim Latona – piano, drums and production
Dave Verellen – vocals and production

Other personnel
Matt Bayles – production, engineering and mixing  
Joe Denardo – photography  
Sig Skavlan – mixing

References

1999 albums
Botch (band) albums
Hydra Head Records albums
Albums produced by Matt Bayles